Tomás Guillermo T. del Rosario (February 10, 1857 – July 4, 1913) was a Filipino judge and statesman who served as the first Governor of the province of Bataan from 1903 to 1905. He is remembered for advocating the separation of church and state.

Del Rosario was born to Cipriano del Rosario and Severina Tongco in Binondo, Manila. He was a judge of the First Instance of Manila from 1888 to 1896. He was deported to Ceuta, Africa from 1896 to 1897 for alleged involvement in the revolution. Upon his return, he became a delegate of Surigao in the Malolos Congress in 1898 and delegate to the Philippine Assembly from 1909 to 1912.

On 2007, the National Historical Institute and provincial government of Bataan unveiled the Gov. Tomás del Rosario marker at the compound in front of the provincial capitol in Balanga.

References

1857 births
1914 deaths
Members of the House of Representatives of the Philippines from Surigao del Norte
Members of the House of Representatives of the Philippines from Surigao del Sur
People from Binondo
Governors of Bataan
Filipino judges
Members of the Malolos Congress
Members of the Philippine Legislature